Arasada is a village in Vangara mandal of Srikakulam district, Andhra Pradesh, India.

Demographics
 Indian census, the demographic details of Arasada village is as follows:
 Total Population: 	3,230 in 802 Households.
 Male Population: 	1,594 and Female Population: 	1,636
 Children Under 6-years of age: 379 (Boys - 190 and Girls - 	189)
 Total Literates: 	1,340

References

Villages in Srikakulam district